Gmina Wiślica is a rural gmina (administrative district) in Busko County, Świętokrzyskie Voivodeship, in south-central Poland.

The gmina contains part of the protected area called Nida Landscape Park.

Villages
Gmina Wiślica contains the villages and settlements of Brzezie, Chotel Czerwony, Gluzy, Górki, Gorysławice, Hołudza, Jurków, Kobylniki, Koniecmosty, Kuchary, Łatanice, Ostrów, Sielec, Skorocice, Skotniki Dolne, Skotniki Górne, Szczerbaków, Szczytniki, Wawrowice and Wiślica.

Neighbouring gminas
Gmina Wiślica is bordered by the gminas of Busko-Zdrój, Czarnocin, Nowy Korczyn, Opatowiec, Pińczów and Złota.

References

Polish official population figures 2006

Wislica
Busko County